Phi Brain: Puzzle of God is a 2011 Japanese anime television series produced by Sunrise. The story follows a genius puzzle solver named Kaito Daimon who, after receiving a bangle that increases his brain power under stress, is challenged to several life-or-death puzzles by a mysterious organization called the POG. The first season aired on NHK Educational TV from October 2, 2011 to April 1, 2012, with the second season airing between April 8, 2012 and September 23, 2012. A third season began airing from October 6, 2013. The anime has been licensed in North America by Sentai Filmworks.

The series uses seven pieces of theme music, three opening themes and four ending themes. For the third season, the opening theme is "Destiny" by neko while the ending theme is "Say Yeah!" by the Genius Terrace Set consisting of Shintarō Asanuma, Kaori Shimizu, Jun Fukuyama, Kouki Miyata and Satsuki Yukino. "diamond secret" by Raetsel (Minori Chihara) and is used as the ending theme in season 3, episode 9. Two insert songs are used in the first season.


Episode list

Season 1

Season 2

Season 3

References

Phi Brain: Puzzle of God